Parveen Sultana ( known by her stage name Diti; 31 March 1965 – 20 March 2016) was a Bangladeshi film and television actress. She won the Bangladesh National Film Award for Best Supporting Actress in 1987 for her performance in Swami Stree. She acted in more than 200 films in her career.

Early life and education
Diti was born in Sonargaon, Narayanganj district to her parents Abul Hossain and Nurjahan Begum. She completed higher secondary examination from Eden Mohila College and bachelor's from Lalmatia Women College.

Career
As a singer, Diti got an award at a national competition by the Bangladesh Shishu Academy. While she was singing for Bangladesh Television, she was noticed by actor Al Mansur. He cast her in the television drama "Laili Majnu" opposite of actor Manas Bandopadhyay. Diti came to the film industry through the talent hunt competition "Notun Mukher Sondhane" in 1984.

Diti debuted her acting career in the film Daak Diye Jai, directed by Udayon Chowdhury. The film was never released. Her first released film was Ami-i Ostad. She acted in television dramas. She also hosted a television show on cooking lessons.

Personal life
Diti married actor Sohel Chowdhury in 1986. Chowdhury was also a winner of the competition "Notun Mukher Sondhane" in the same year as Diti was. Chowdhury died from gun shots in 1998 at Trumps Club in Banani. The couple were divorced before this incident. Together they had a daughter, Lamia Chowdhury (b.1987), and a son, Shafayet Chowdhury Dipto (b. 1989). Later Diti married actor Ilias Kanchan which ended up in divorce as well.

Cancer and death 
Diti was diagnosed with brain cancer on 25 July 2015. She was treated in Madras Institute of Orthopaedics and Traumatology in Chennai, India, and died on 20 March 2016 in the United Hospital in Dhaka.

Selected filmography

Awards

References

External links
 

1965 births
2016 deaths
Bangladeshi film actresses
Bangladeshi television actresses
Bangladeshi television personalities
Best Supporting Actress National Film Award (Bangladesh) winners
People from Sonargaon Upazila
Deaths from brain cancer in Bangladesh
Eden Mohila College alumni
Best Supporting Actress Bachsas Award winners